Dowkushkan, also rendered as Dokushkan, may refer to:
 Dowkushkan-e Hoseynkhani
 Dowkushkan-e Reza Khani